The discography of Nigerian-born, Australian rock singer-songwriter James Reyne.

Albums

Studio albums

Live albums

Compilation albums

Extended plays

Singles

See also
 Australian Crawl
 Australian Crawl discography
 Company of Strangers (group)

References

Discographies of Australian artists
Rock music discographies
Pop music discographies